Stefan Arvidsson (born 1968) is a Swedish historian who is Professor of the History of Religions at Stockholm University and Professor in the Study of Religions at Linnaeus University.

Biography
Stefan Arvidsson was born in Tranås, Sweden in 1968. Arvidsson received his PhD in the History of religions at Lund University in 2000. 

In 2007, he was appointed Associate Professor of the History of Religions at Stockholm University. Since 2012, he has been Professor in the History of Religions at Stockholm University and Professor in the Study of Religions at Linnaeus University.

Theories
Arvidsson is a Marxist, "but not in a dogmatic way". Regretting that the Swedish Social Democratic Party and the Left Party have abandoned what he considers genuine socialism, he is a proponent of a more radical form of socialism in line with the "Eat the Rich" slogan. Arvidsson refers to this as "romantic socialism", which he contrasts with "classic socialism". He has been the author and editor of numerous Marxist publications. Several of his publications and research projects have been funded by Sveriges riksbank. 

Arvidsson's PhD thesis examined Indo-European studies, and was published in English under the title Aryan Idols. The Indo-European Mythology as Ideology and Science (2006). Arvidsson considers Indo-European studies to be a pseudoscientific field, and has described Indo-European mythology as "the most sinister mythology of modern times". In his works, Arvidsson has sought to expose what he considers to be fascist political sympathies of Indo-Europeanists such as Georges Dumézil. Arvidsson suggests that such an exposure may result in the abolishment ("Ragnarök") of the concept of Indo-European mythology.

Selected works
 Den lilla marxisten. En sorts ordbok, 2005
 Aryan Idols. Indo-European Mythology as Science and Ideology, 2006 
 Draksjukan. Mytiska fantasier hos Tolkien, Wagner och de Vries, 2007
 Marxismens filosofi, 2007
 Morgonrodnad: socialismens stil och mytologi 1871-1914, 2016
 The style and mythology of socialism: socialist idealism, 1871-1914, 2017
 Socialist Imaginations: Utopias, Myths, and the Masses. 2018
 Religion and politics under capitalism: A humanistic approach to the terminology, 2019

References

Further reading

External links
 Heart in a Heartless World - Personal website of Stefan Arvidsson

1968 births
Academic staff of Linnaeus University
Lund University alumni
People from Jönköping County
Academic staff of Stockholm University
Swedish editors
Swedish historians of religion
Swedish non-fiction writers
Living people